Great South West may refer to:

 Great South West Road, in South West England
 Great South West Walk, in Australia